The Theodore Rozek House is a historic house at 6337 N. Hermitage Avenue in the Edgewater neighborhood of Chicago, Illinois. The house was built in 1908 for Theodore Rozek, a printer and German immigrant, and his family. Architect Clarence Hatzfeld designed the original house in the American Foursquare style, a popular vernacular style of the early twentieth century. Like many other Foursquare homes, the house had a square shape and was topped by a hip roof with a dormer. In the mid-1920s, architect Andrew E. Norman designed an addition for the front of the house; this addition was inspired by the Better Homes movement, which sought to bring high-level architecture to working-class homes. The addition replaced the original front porch with a semi-circular porch supported by its original columns, distinguishing the house from its neighbors.

The house was added to the National Register of Historic Places on November 2, 2011.

References

External links

Houses on the National Register of Historic Places in Chicago
American Foursquare architecture in Illinois
Houses completed in 1908